The Saskatchewan Science Centre is an interactive science museum located in Regina, Saskatchewan. It is owned and operated as a not-for-profit charitable organization. Located in a former power plant in the Wascana Centre, the Saskatchewan Science Centre was officially opened in April 1989 as the Powerhouse of Discovery. In 1991 the Science Center was expanded with the addition of the Kramer IMAX Theater.

Principal activities and programming

Exhibit Floor Contains permanent displays, travelling exhibits, interactive demonstrations, and stage shows.
Kramer IMAX Theater The only IMAX theater in the city of Regina. The theater completed conversion to IMAX 3D in October, 2010.
Educational Programming Educational and entertaining programs are delivered to students and communities all across Saskatchewan and to those who cannot come to the Science Centre through the Science Outreach program.
Special Events Special events include: Adult Science Nights, Ignite! Festival, the After Dark Film Series, Fantasy Food, as well as attendance at public events such as Canada Day celebrations.

Permanent exhibits

The Saskatchewan Science Centre has many permanent exhibits which make up the backbone of the operations of the centre. These exhibits are complemented by travelling and temporary exhibits as well as occasional special programs run by the Centre.

Critters! Exhibit includes many live animals such as a bearded dragon, sugar glider, great horned owl, snakes, and salamanders.
Ukrainian Science Park A free to access children's playground located outside the Science Center. Features physics demonstrating play structures such as pulleys and tunnels. 
WILD! Saskatchewan An interactive exhibit about the environment and environmental conservation.
Space Stadium Canada The exhibit highlights and explores Canadian contributions to Space exploration. Features the gyro gym, a spinning device similar to one that was developed by NASA for astronaut training.
Richardson Ag-Grow-Land The exhibit focuses on Saskatchewan’s contributions to the agriculture industry, as well as technologies and logistics common to modern industrial farming.   

Science of Hockey An exhibit exploring hockey through a scientific lens. Features a game with a brainwave controlled ball and several physical tests participants can compete in. 

The Science Centre features other permanent displays each highlighting different topics.

Affiliations
The Science Centre is affiliated with the Saskatchewan Museums Association and the Canadian Association of Science Centres.

References

 Scott Langen, "Saskatchewan Science Centre," Encyclopedia of Saskatchewan.
 Saskatchewan Science Centre Website

External links

Saskatchewan Science Centre

Science museums in Canada
Museums in Regina, Saskatchewan